Mahal Pearce (born 3 November 1977) is a professional golfer from New Zealand.

He resides in Dunedin, New Zealand. He won the New Zealand Open in 2003.

Professional wins (2)

PGA Tour of Australasia wins (1)

Von Nida Tour wins (1)

References

External links

Mahal Pearce at the OneAsia official site

New Zealand male golfers
PGA Tour of Australasia golfers
Sportspeople from Dunedin
1977 births
Living people